The Adelphi Theatre  is a West End theatre, located on the Strand in the City of Westminster, central London. The present building is the fourth on the site. The theatre has specialised in comedy and musical theatre, and today it is a receiving house for a variety of productions, including many musicals. The theatre was Grade II listed for historical preservation on 1 December 1987.

History

19th century
It was founded in 1806 as the Sans Pareil ("Without Compare"), by merchant John Scott, and his daughter Jane (1770–1839).  Jane was a British theatre manager, performer, and playwright.  Together, they gathered a theatrical company and by 1809 the theatre was licensed for musical entertainments, pantomime, and burletta.  She wrote more than fifty stage pieces in an array of genres: melodramas, pantomimes, farces, comic operettas, historical dramas, and adaptations, as well as translations.  Jane Scott retired to Surrey in 1819, marrying John Davies Middleton (1790–1867).

On 18 October 1819, the theatre reopened under its present name, which was adopted from the Adelphi Buildings opposite.
In its early years, the theatre was known for melodrama, called Adelphi Screamers. Many stories by Charles Dickens were also adapted for the stage here, including John Baldwin Buckstone's The Christening, a comic burletta, which opened on 13 October 1834, based on the story The Bloomsbury Christening. This is notable for being thought the first Dickens adaption performed. This was the first of many of Dickens's early works adapted for the stage of the Adelphi, including The Pickwick Papers as William Leman Rede's The Peregrinations of Pickwick; or, Boz-i- a-na, a three-act burletta first performed on 3 April 1837, Frederick Henry Yates's production of Nicholas Nickleby; or, Doings at Do-The-Boys Hall in November and December 1838, and Edward Stirling's two-act burletta The Old Curiosity Shop; or, One Hour from Humphrey's Clock (November and December 1840, January 1841). The theatre itself makes a cameo appearance in The Pickwick Papers

The Adelphi came under the management of Madame Celeste and comedian Benjamin Webster, in 1844, and Buckstone was appointed its resident dramatist. Dramatisations of Dickens continued to be performed, including A Christmas Carol; or, Past, Present, and Future opening on 5 February; and Beckett's The Chimes: A Goblin Story of Some Bells that rang an Old Year out and a New One In. In 1848, The Haunted Man and the Ghost's Bargain was performed.

The old theatre was demolished, and on 26 December 1858, The New Adelphi was opened and was considered an improvement on the cramped circumstances of the original, which had been described as a "hasty conversion from a tavern hall, permanently kept in its provisional state". The new theatre could seat 1,500 people, with standing room for another 500. The interior was lighted by a Stroud's Patent Sun Lamp, a brilliant array of gas mantles passed through a chandelier of cut-glass.

In the mid-19th century, John Lawrence Toole established his comedic reputation at the Adelphi.  Also in the mid-19th century, the Adelphi hosted a number of French operettas, including La belle Hélène.  In 1867, however, the Adelphi gave English comic opera a boost by hosting the first public performance of Arthur Sullivan's first opera, Cox and Box.

The building was renovated in 1879 and again in 1887 when the house next door, along with The Hampshire Hog in The Strand and the Nell Gwynne Tavern in Bull Inn Court, were bought by the Gattis in order to enlarge the theatre. They also built a new enlarged facade and part of this can still be seen today above the Crystal Rooms next door to the present Adelphi Theatre.

An actor who performed regularly at the Adelphi in the latter half of the 19th century, William Terriss, was stabbed to death during the run of 'Secret Service' on 16 December 1897 whilst entering the Theatre by the royal entrance in Maiden Lane which he used as a private entrance.  This is now recorded on a plaque on the wall by the stage door.  Outside a neighbouring pub, a sign says that the killer was one of the theatre's stage hands, but Richard Archer Prince committed the murder.  It has been said that Terriss' ghost haunts the theatre.  Terriss' daughter was Ellaline Terriss, a famous actress, and her husband, actor-manager Seymour Hicks managed the Adelphi for some years at the end of the 19th century.  The stage door of the current Adelphi is in Maiden Lane but back then it was in Bull Inn Court. William Terriss would later have a Theatre named after him, the Terriss Theatre in Rotherhithe, later known as the Rotherhithe Hippodrome.

The adjacent, numbers 409 and 410 Strand, were built in 1886–87 by the Gatti Brothers as the Adelphi Restaurant. The frontage remains essentially the same, but with plate glass windows, and, like the theatre, is a Grade II listed building.

20th century

On 11 September 1901, the third theatre was opened as the Century Theatre, although the name reverted in 1904 under the management of Otho Stuart. This theatre was built by Frank Kirk to the design of Ernest Runtz. George Edwardes, the dean of London musical theatre, took over management of the theatre from Stuart in 1908.  In the early part of the 20th century, the Adelphi was home to a number of musical comedies, the most successful of which included The Earl and the Girl (1904), The Dairymaids (1907), The Quaker Girl (1910), The Boy (1917), Clowns in Clover (1927), and Mr. Cinders (1929).

The present Adelphi opened on 3 December 1930, redesigned in the Art Deco style by Ernest Schaufelberg.  It was named the 'Royal Adelphi Theatre' and re-opened with the hit musical Ever Green, by Lorenz Hart and Richard Rodgers, based on the book Benn W. Levy.  Noël Coward's Words and Music premièred at the theatre in 1932.  The operetta Balalaika (a revised version of The Gay Hussars) played at the theatre in 1936, and in 1940 the theatre's name again reverted to 'The Adelphi'.  The theatre continued to host comedy and musicals, including Bless The Bride (1947), Maggie May (1964), and A Little Night Music (1975), as well as dramas (see below for a list beginning in 1979).

A proposed redevelopment of Covent Garden by the GLC in 1968 saw the theatre under threat, together with the nearby Vaudeville, Garrick, Lyceum and Duchess theatres. An active campaign by Equity, the Musicians' Union, and theatre owners under the auspices of the Save London Theatres Campaign led to the abandonment of the scheme.

On 27 February 1982, the Adelphi hosted the final night of the D'Oyly Carte Opera Company for a concert performance of songs from all thirteen Savoy Operas as well as Cox and Box and Thespis.  In 1993, Andrew Lloyd Webber's Really Useful Group purchased the theatre and completely refurbished it prior to the opening of his adaptation of Sunset Boulevard.  The 1998 video of Lloyd Webber's musical Cats was filmed at the theatre.

21st century
In November 1997, the London production of the popular American musical Chicago premiered at the Adelphi, becoming the venue's longest-ever production during its eight-and-a-half-year run (which also made it the longest running American musical in West End history).  In April 2006, Chicago transferred to the Cambridge Theatre (and later to the Garrick Theatre, where it closed in 2012.).

Michael Grandage's revival of Andrew Lloyd Webber's Evita replaced the show, beginning previews on 2 June 2006 before completing a twelve-month run on 26 May 2007.  Brian Wilson performed his album Pet Sounds for the last time in the UK at the Adelphi in November 2006.  From 6 July 2007, the Adelphi was home to another Lloyd Webber revival, Joseph and the Amazing Technicolor Dreamcoat. The actor playing Joseph, Lee Mead, was cast by winning the BBC television show Any Dream Will Do, and starred alongside Preeya Kalidas and Dean Collinson.

9 March 2010 saw the premiere of the Andrew Lloyd Webber musical, Love Never Dies, which closed on Saturday 27 August 2011.  The National Theatre transferred their show One Man, Two Guvnors to the theatre from 8 November 2011. This production moved out of the theatre on 25 February 2012, transferring to the Theatre Royal Haymarket, London.

Sweeney Todd, the Demon Barber of Fleet Street began a limited season at the Adelphi from 10 March to 22 September 2012, transferring from the Chichester Festival Theatre, starring Michael Ball and Imelda Staunton.

In March 2019, Waitress opened at the Adelphi. It was set to close on 4 July 2020, but it closed on 16 March, when West End theatres shut down due to the COVID-19 pandemic; the producers later announced the show will not re-open.

The theatre is currently owned and managed by the Adelphi Theatre Company Limited, a partnership between Andrew Lloyd Webber's LW Theatres and Nederlander International.

Productions
My Fair Lady (25 October 1979 – 31 October 1981)
The 1981–82 D'Oyly Carte Opera Company Season (11 November 1981 – 27 February 1982)
The American Dream Machine (20 October 1982 – 1 December 1982)
Marilyn! the Musical (17 March 1983 – 30 July 1983)
Poppy  (12 November 1983 – 4 February 1984)
Lena Horne – The Lady and Her Music (6 August 1984 – 29 September 1984)
The Jungle Book (4 December 1984 – 12 January 1985)
Me and My Girl (12 February 1985 – 16 January 1993)
Sunset Boulevard (12 July 1993 – April 1997)
Damn Yankees (4 June 1997 – 9 August 1997)
Chicago (19 November 1997 – 22 April 2006)
Evita (20 June 2006 – 26 May 2007)
Joseph and the Amazing Technicolor Dreamcoat (6 July 2007 – 30 May 2009)
Derren Brown: Enigma (15 June 2009 – 23 July 2009)
The Rat Pack: Live from Las Vegas (24 September 2009 – 2 January 2010)
Love Never Dies (9 March 2010 – 27 August 2011)
One Man, Two Guvnors (21 November 2011 – 25 February 2012)
Sweeney Todd: The Demon Barber of Fleet Street (10 March 2012 – 22 September 2012)
The Bodyguard (6 November 2012 – 29 August 2014)
Made in Dagenham (5 November 2014 – 11 April 2015)
Kinky Boots (21 August 2015 – 12 January 2019)
Bumblescratch (4 September 2016)
Waitress (6 March 2019 – 16 March 2020)
Back to the Future: The Musical (20 August 2021 – present)

References

Bibliography
Nelson, Alfred and Cross, Gilbert. The Adelphi Theatre 1806–1900: A Calendar of Performances
Guide to British Theatres 1750–1950, John Earl and Michael Sell pp. 96–7 (Theatres Trust, 2000)

External links

Official website at LW Theatres
The Adelphi Theatre 1806–1900: A Calendar of Performances, from an Eastern Michigan University website
Adelphi Theatre History
Information about Ever Green and the 1930 re-opening of the theatre
Guide to Adelphi Theatre Records at Houghton Library, Harvard University

West End theatres
Theatres completed in 1806
Theatres completed in 1930
Theatres in the City of Westminster
Grade II listed buildings in the City of Westminster
Grade II listed theatres
Art Deco architecture in London
1806 establishments in England
Theatre company production histories
Strand, London